Sue Walker (born 14 September 1967) is a British rower. In the 1997 World Rowing Championships, she won a gold medal in the women's coxless four event.

References

See also

British female rowers
World Rowing Championships medalists for Great Britain
Living people
1967 births
Place of birth missing (living people)